William Comins (April 16, 1901 – July 14, 1965) was an American athlete. He competed in the men's long jump at the 1924 Summer Olympics.

References

External links
 

1901 births
1965 deaths
Athletes (track and field) at the 1924 Summer Olympics
American male long jumpers
Olympic track and field athletes of the United States
Yale Bulldogs men's track and field athletes
Track and field athletes from Connecticut
People from Stafford, Connecticut